Clive Stafford Soley, Baron Soley  (born 7 May 1939) is a Labour Party politician in the United Kingdom. He served as a Member of Parliament (MP) from 1979 to 2005, and later as a Member of the House of Lords until 2023.

Early life
He went to Downshall Secondary Modern School (eventually ended up as Seven Kings High School) on Aldborough Road in Seven Kings near Ilford, then Newbattle Adult Education College in Newbattle, Midlothian, from 1961 to 1963. He did RAF National Service from 1959 to 1961. He went to the University of Strathclyde, where he gained a BA in Politics and Psychology in 1968, then the University of Southampton, where he gained a Diploma in Applied Social Studies in 1970. He was a British Council Officer from 1968 to 1969, then a Probation Officer from 1970 to 1979 for the Inner London Probation Service. He was a councillor on Hammersmith Council from 1974 to 1978.

Parliamentary career
Soley was a Labour Party Member of Parliament from 1979, first for the constituency of Hammersmith North, then Hammersmith and finally Ealing, Acton and Shepherd's Bush from 1997 to 2005. In 1981, he was a member of the anti-nuclear Labour Party Defence Study Group and was chair of the Parliamentary Labour Party from 1997 to 2001.  In 2003, he voted in favour of the government's decision to engage in military action against Iraq despite the absence of convincing evidence that Iraq still had an active WMD programme.

In 2005, it was announced that he would be given a life peerage, and on 29 June 2005 he was created Baron Soley, of Hammersmith in the London Borough of Hammersmith and Fulham.
He was from 2005 to 2010 Campaign Director of Future Heathrow, an organisation dedicated to the expansion of Heathrow. He was from 2004 to 2016, chair of the trustees of Mary Seacole Memorial Statue Appeal, now renamed the Mary Seacole Trust, which worked for the erection of the statue of Mary Seacole in the grounds of St Thomas's Hospital in London.

Personal life
Soley has a son and daughter. He is an Honorary Associate of the National Secular Society.

References

External links

 Hammersmith & Fulham Labour Party
 Guardian Politics Ask Aristotle – Clive Soley
 Lord Soley of Hammersmith Open Rights Group
 BBC Politics profile, 2002

1939 births
Living people
Alumni of the University of Southampton
Alumni of the University of Strathclyde
British bloggers
Labour Party (UK) life peers
Labour Party (UK) MPs for English constituencies
People from Ilford
UK MPs 1979–1983
UK MPs 1983–1987
UK MPs 1987–1992
UK MPs 1992–1997
UK MPs 1997–2001
UK MPs 2001–2005
Royal Air Force airmen
Life peers created by Elizabeth II